Fontrailles is a commune in the Hautes-Pyrénées department in south-western France. The commune belongs to the canton of Les Coteaux and the arrondissement of Tarbes. The inhabitants are called Fontraillais and Fontraillaises. Its population was 158 in 2018. The area is 9.0 square kilometers.

See also
Communes of the Hautes-Pyrénées department
 Jouandassou B&B/Chambres d'hôtes in Fontrailles

References

Communes of Hautes-Pyrénées